The 31st Training Squadron is a unit of the Japan Air Self-Defense Force. It comes under the authority of the 1st Air Wing of Air Training Command. It is based at Hamamatsu Air Base in Shizuoka Prefecture. It is equipped with Kawasaki T-4 aircraft.

Aircraft used
 Kawasaki T-4 (1989-)

References

Units of the Japan Air Self-Defense Force